The K1 class was a type of gunboat designed by the German Kriegsmarine before World War II. The class was to have comprised four ships, which had been ordered under the provisional names K1, K2, K3, and K4. The four ships were ordered in November 1938, and were scheduled to have been completed by early 1942. However, the contracts for the four ships were canceled on 19 September 1939, two weeks after the start of World War II.

Design

General characteristics and machinery
The ships were of steel construction, and had 11 watertight compartments. The ships were to have used a pair of 4-cylinder triple expansion diesel engines that provided , which would have driven two propellers. The ships were designed to carry 176 tons of fuel oil.

Armament
The K1-class ships primary armament consisted of four  L/65 quick-firing guns in two twin-turrets, one fore and one aft of the superstructure. Both types of ammunition used a single propellant charge: the  RPC/32 charge.

The ships were also armed with two  L/83 Flak guns, and four heavy machine guns.

Construction and cancellation
The four ships were ordered on 11 November 1938, at the cost of 6 million Reichsmarks apiece. K1 was planned to have been completed on 20 May 1941, K2 was to have followed on 15 September, K3 was to be completed by 15 January 1942, and K4, the final ship of the class, was to be completed a month later on 14 February. However, the outbreak of World War II in early September 1939 meant that construction priorities was shifted away from less critical projects. As a result, the K1 class was canceled on 19 September 1939.

Footnotes

References
 

Gunboats of Germany